The Paroo River, a series of waterholes, connected in wet weather as a running stream of the Darling catchment within the Murray–Darling basin, is located in the South West region of Queensland and Far West region of New South Wales, Australia. It is the home of the Paarkantji people.

Course and features
The river rises in the gorge country of western Queensland south of the Mariala National Park, and flows generally south and spreads into the vast floodplains of New South Wales, eventually reaching the Paroo overflow lakes. Most commonly, the Paroo River terminates on the floodplain south of Wanaaring; and only reaches the Darling River in the wettest of years, otherwise spilling into the Paroo River Wetlands. The river is joined by forty-three minor tributaries; as it descends  over its  course.

The Paroo River is the last remaining free-flowing river in the northern part of the Murray-Darling basin; and is impounded by the natural formation of the Buckenby Waterhole, Humeburn Waterhole, Corni Paroo Waterhole, Caiwarro Waterhole, Thoulcanna Dam, Talyealye Billabong and Budtha Waterhole.

Wetlands
The Paroo River wetlands in north-western New South Wales are important for threatened species such as the freckled duck and the Australian painted snipe.  They lie within the Paroo Floodplain and Currawinya Important Bird Area, identified as such by BirdLife International because of its importance, when conditions are suitable, for large numbers of waterbirds.

On 20 September 2007, Malcolm Turnbull, the Minister for the Environment and Water Resources, announced that the Paroo River Wetlands in north-west New South Wales would be listed under the Ramsar Convention as wetlands of international importance, making them Australia's 65th Ramsar site.

Gallery

See also

Rivers of Queensland
Rivers of New South Wales
Ecological character description for Paroo River Wetlands Ramsar site – NSW Govt

References

Rivers of Queensland
Ramsar sites in Australia
Tributaries of the Darling River
South West Queensland
Far West (New South Wales)